So True is the first single released by New Zealand Reggae band, The Black Seeds in 2005. It debuted in the New Zealand singles charts at #32 and stayed in the charts for nine weeks.

2005 singles
The Black Seeds songs
2005 songs